The 1978 Metro Conference men's basketball tournament was held March 2–4 at the Riverfront Coliseum in Cincinnati, Ohio. 

 defeated top-seeded  in the championship game, 94–93, to win their first Metro men's basketball tournament.

The Cardinals, in turn, received a bid to the 1978 NCAA Tournament. They were joined by fellow Metro member, and tournament runner-up, Florida State, who earned an at-large bid.

Format
All seven of the conference's members participated in the tournament field. They were seeded based on regular season conference records, with the top team earning a bye into the semifinal round. The other six teams entered into the preliminary first round.

Bracket

References

Metro Conference men's basketball tournament
Tournament
Metro Conference men's basketball tournament
Metro Conference men's basketball tournament